Plant defensins (formerly gamma-thionins) are a family of small, cysteine-rich defensins found in plants that serve to defend them against pathogens and parasites.

History 
The first plant defensins were discovered in barley and wheat in 1990 and were initially designated as a γ-thionins. In 1995 the name was changed to 'plant defensin' when it was identified that they are evolutionarily unrelated to other thionins and were more similar to defensins from insects and mammals.

Function 
Plant defensins are a large component of the plant innate immune system. A plant genome typically contains large numbers of different defensin genes that vary in their efficacies against different pathogens and the amount they are expressed in different tissues.

Antimicrobial activity 
The modes of action of different defensins depends on the type of fungus they are interacting with. Most characterized plant defensins are antimicrobial peptides. Both antifungal and antibacterial plant defensins have been identified, although their exact mechanisms of action vary.

Enzyme inhibition 
Some plant defensins have also been identified as enzyme inhibitors of α-amylase or trypsin. It is believed that these are antifeedant activities to deter insects.

Anti-cancer 
An additional promiscuous activity of some plant defensins is stopping the growth or disrupting the membranes of cancer cells in in vitro experiments.

Structure 

Defensin proteins are produced as a precursor protein with one or two prodomains that are removed to make the final mature protein. In their mature form, they generally consist of about 45 to 50 amino-acid residues. The folded structure is characterised by a well-defined 3-stranded anti-parallel beta-sheet and a short alpha-helix. The structure of most plant defensins is cross-linked by four disulfide bridges: three in core and one linking the N- and C-termini. Some plant defensins have only the core three disulphides, and a few have been found with an additional one (resulting in five total bridges).

Evolution 
Plant defensins are members of the protein superfamily called the cis-defensins or CSαβ fold. This superfamily includes arthropod defensins and fungal defensins (but not defensins found in mammals). It also includes several families of proteins not involved in the immune system, including plant S-locus 11 proteins involved in self-incompatibility during reproduction, and toxin proteins in scorpion venoms.

Examples 
The following plant proteins belong to this family:

 The flower-specific Nicotiana alata defensin (NaD1)
 Gamma-thionins from Triticum aestivum (wheat) endosperm (gamma-purothionins) and gamma-hordothionins from Hordeum vulgare (barley) are toxic to animal cells and inhibit protein synthesis in cell free systems.
 A flower-specific thionin (FST) from Nicotiana tabacum (common tobacco).
 Antifungal proteins (AFP) from the seeds of Brassicaceae species such as radish, mustard, turnip and Arabidopsis thaliana (thale cress).
 Inhibitors of insect alpha-amylases from sorghum.
 Probable protease inhibitor P322 from Solanum tuberosum (potato).
 A germination-related protein from Vigna unguiculata (cowpea).
 Anther-specific protein SF18 from sunflower. SF18 is a protein that contains a gamma-thionin domain at its N-terminus and a proline-rich C-terminal domain.
 Glycine max (soybean) sulfur-rich protein SE60.
 Vicia faba (broad bean) antibacterial peptides fabatin-1 and -2.

Databases
A database for antimicrobial peptides, including defensins is available: PhytAMP (http://phytamp.hammamilab.org).

References

Subfamilies
Gamma Purothionin 

Protein domains
Peripheral membrane proteins
Defensins